The Prison Security Act 1992 (c 25) is an Act of the Parliament of the United Kingdom.

Section 1 - Offence of prison mutiny

This section reads:

Section 1(6) is prospectively amended by sections 74 and 80 of, and paragraph 115 of Schedule 7 to, the Criminal Justice and Court Services Act 2000.

Kenneth Baker said that section 1 was "intentionally quite strict"

As to sentencing, see R v Ali [1998] 2 Cr App R (S) 123, CA.

See also Crown Prosecution Service guidance on prison mutiny.

Section 2 - Offences relating to escape
Section 2(1) amends section 39 of the Prison Act 1952.

Section 2(2) amends section 22(2)(b) of the Criminal Justice Act 1961.

Section 2(3) repealed section 22(1) of, and the entry relating to section 39 of the Prison Act 1952 in Schedule 4 to, the Criminal Justice Act 1961.

Section 3 - Short title, commencement and extent
Section 3(2) provides that the Act came into force at the end of the period of two months that began on the date on which it was passed. The word "months" means calendar months. The day (that is to say, 16 March 1992) on which the Act was passed (that is to say, received royal assent) is included in the period of two months. This means that the Act came into force on 16 May 1992.

See also
Prison Act

References
Halsbury's Statutes,

External links

The Prison Security Act 1992, as amended from the National Archives.
The Prison Security Act 1992, as originally enacted from the National Archives.

United Kingdom Acts of Parliament 1992